KTSE-FM (97.1 FM) is a radio station broadcasting a Spanish CHR format. Licensed to Patterson, California, United States, it serves the Modesto area.  The station is currently owned by Entravision Communications.
Prior to 2009 It was an Adult Hits Station branded as Jose 97.1 until 2018 when the station flipped to the La Suavecita Network, and to simulcast on Sister station KCVR-FM 98.9 FM until the simulcast on 98.9 ended, and flipped to Country Music in 2019 and then to the Top 40 Fuego format to match its distant sister stations including KDVA in Phoenix AZ, KINT-FM in El Paso TX, KJMN in Denver CO, KLOB in Palm Springs CA, KNVO in the Rio Grande Valley, and KSEH in Brawley.

External links

TSE-FM
TSE-FM
Mass media in Stanislaus County, California
Entravision Communications stations
Radio stations established in 1998
Regional Mexican radio stations in the United States
Contemporary hit radio stations in the United States
1998 establishments in California